Jan Hendrik "Roepie" Kruize (18 January 1925 in Heemstede – 14 February 1992 in The Hague) was a former field hockey player from the Netherlands. He was one of the Netherlands's most famous players in the years following World War II. Kruize won the bronze medal with the Dutch Men's Team at the 1948 Summer Olympics in London, followed by the silver medal, four years later in Helsinki.

References
 Dutch Olympic Committee

External links
 

1925 births
1992 deaths
Dutch male field hockey players
Dutch field hockey coaches
Olympic field hockey players of the Netherlands
Field hockey players at the 1948 Summer Olympics
Field hockey players at the 1952 Summer Olympics
Olympic silver medalists for the Netherlands
Olympic bronze medalists for the Netherlands
People from Heemstede
Olympic medalists in field hockey
Medalists at the 1952 Summer Olympics
Medalists at the 1948 Summer Olympics
HC Klein Zwitserland players
Sportspeople from North Holland
20th-century Dutch people